Steve Witting is an American actor and director.  He first found fame while starring in the 1980s comedy series Valerie (1987) as Jason Bateman's nerdy friend Bert. He has since gone on to star in several other TV series and films, including Batman Returns (1992), Hoffa (1992) and Shutter Island (2010). He made his directorial debut in 1991 when he directed an episode of Step by Step (1991). Witting also played the main role in a full motion video game for the Sega Mega CD called Wirehead. He played a role in The Wolf of Wall Street.

Witting began acting by joining Richmond Hill High School drama club in Queens where he was encouraged by Alfred Christie, a teacher who ran Hampton Playhouse in Hampton Beach, New Hampshire. In 1977, Witting, who was 17 at the time, moved to New Hampshire to work at the Hampton Playhouse as an apprentice. During this time Witting met his future wife, Renee Rogers, who was also a Hampton Playhouse apprentice. Many summers throughout his career Witting returned to the Hampton Playhouse as either an actor or director until the Playhouse was demolished in 2001.

Partial filmography
The Flamingo Kid (1984) - Frank
Batman Returns (1992) - Josh
Hoffa (1992) - Eliot Cookson
Dave (1993) - Secret Service #1
Stone Soup (1993) - Frank
Matlock (1993, TV Series) - young Ben Matlock (The Dame, The Diner)
3rd Rock From the Sun (1999) - Ted
Catch Me If You Can (2002) - Manager
The Men Who Stare at Goats (2009) - PSIC Worker #1
Shutter Island (2010) - Doctor
Identity Thief (2013) - Bus Station Attendant Carl
Bad Words (2013) - Proctor at Spelling Bee
Gods Behaving Badly (2013) - Carl
The Wolf of Wall Street (2013) - SEC Attorney #2
The Longest Week (2014) - Museum Host
The Family Fang (2015) - Art Critic Jacob Deforest
It's Always Sunny in Philadelphia (2016) - Wally Schmidt
The Post (2017) - NY Times Staffer

References

External links

Living people
American directors
American male stage actors
American male television actors
American male film actors
Year of birth missing (living people)